Mosinet Geremew (born 12 February 1992) is an Ethiopian middle-distance and long-distance runner. 

Mosinet's career started in cross country running. He ran in the junior category at the 2010 IAAF World Cross Country Championships and placed 16th overall – he was not a point-scoring runner for the Ethiopian team.  He returned to the same venue (Bydgoszcz) as a senior competitor at the 2013 IAAF World Cross Country Championships, though his 24th-place finish again left him out of the team point scoring. In 2012 he won the 10k Paderborner Osterlauf in Germany in 27:53 min.

He became the first person to win twice at the Yangzhou Jianzhen International Half Marathon, winning four times in a row, including a course record of 59:52 minutes – the fastest achieved in a Chinese race. In 2015 he was the winner of the Ras Al Khaimah Half Marathon.

On 15 May 2016 he won the Bangalore 10k in a time of 28:36, after his victory the previous year. At the 2018 edition of the run, he placed third in a time of 28:39 after fellow countrymen BIrhanu Legese with 28:38 and the winner Geoffrey Kamworor (Kenya) in 28:18.

He achieved bigger popularity in 2018 by winning the Dubai Marathon in a course record time of 2:04:00 (with seven runners below 2:05) as well as a second place in the Chicago Marathon.  

At the 2019 London Marathon, he finished in second place behind Eliud Kipchoge with a time of 2:02:55, the third-fastest time in history.

On 17 July 2022, Mosinet won his second World Championship Silver Medal in the 2022 World Athletics Championships – Men's marathon, finishing behind Tamirat Tola in a time of 2:06:44.

International competitions

Circuit wins
Dubai Marathon: 2018 (2:04:00)
Yangzhou Jianzhen International Half Marathon: 2015–2018
Ras Al Khaimah Half Marathon: 2015
Peachtree Road Race: 2013
Great Ethiopian Run: 2011

References

Personal Bests

External links

 

1992 births
Living people
Ethiopian male long-distance runners
Ethiopian male middle-distance runners
World Athletics Championships athletes for Ethiopia
Place of birth missing (living people)
World Athletics Championships medalists
20th-century Ethiopian people
21st-century Ethiopian people